George A. Dondero High School (formerly Royal Oak High School) opened in 1927 in Royal Oak, Michigan in Greater Detroit. It was named after former Royal Oak School Board president and U.S. representative George A. Dondero. A part of the Royal Oak Neighborhood Schools, it and Clarence M. Kimball High School were consolidated to form the current Royal Oak High School.

Overview 

Due to declining enrollment, the school became a middle school at the beginning of the 2007/2008 school year. Dondero was closed following the 2005/2006 school year to allow for renovations, and district high school students from both Dondero and Kimball High School were consolidated. At the peak of enrollment, Dondero had more than 2,000 students. During the years prior to its closure, this number dropped to 852.

On October 31, 2006, the Dondero gymnasium was set on fire, causing extensive damage. Arson was suspected, and two teenage suspects were later arrested.

On October 20, 2007, the building was officially re-dedicated as Royal Oak Middle School. The dedication ceremony took place at 4:20 PM in the restored auditorium housing three huge W.P.A. murals.

Notable alumni 
Jason Beverlin, American Major League Baseball player
William Broomfield, American politician, businessman and philanthropist
Daniel Casey, American screenwriter
Bud Chamberlain, American baseball player and realtor
Marie Donigan, member of the Michigan House of Representatives
Glenn Frey, American musician and actor, a founding member of the Eagles
Dave Gillanders - 1960 Olympic bronze medalist in swimming 
Judith Guest, American novelist and screenwriter
Tom Hayden, American social and political activist and politician
Maynard Morrison, football All-American
Bill Muncey, hydroplane racing champion 
Chris Savino, American cartoonist, animator, and writer, and creator of the animated series The Loud House.
Steve Stockman, American politician
Jack Tompkins, American baseball and ice hockey player, airline executive and Greater Detroit area civic leader
Jordan Vogt-Roberts, American film and television director
Norm Zauchin, American Major League Baseball player

References

External links 

 Dondero High School (Archive)
 Detroit News Article about closure

Educational institutions established in 1927
Schools in Royal Oak, Michigan
Former high schools in Michigan
Educational institutions disestablished in 2006
High schools in Oakland County, Michigan
1927 establishments in Michigan